J-blog may refer to:

 Journalist blog, a blog written by a journalist
 J-blogosphere, blogs with a Jewish focus